James Corboy, S.J., was an Irish Jesuit priest who served as became Bishop of Monze, Zambia, he also served as Rector of the Jesuit Theology School at Milltown Park.

Biography 
Born on October 20th, 1916, in Caherconlish, County Limerick, James was educated at the Jesuit schools of Crescent, Limerick and Clongowes Wood College. He joined the Jesuits in Emo Court. He trained as a Jesuit at Tullabeg, and Rathfarnham Castle, while studying Arts in University College Dublin before teaching for a time in Belvedere College. Following his Theology Studies in Milltown he was ordained in 1948. He completed further studies in Rome at the Pontifical Gregorian University, receiving a doctorate in theology.

Returning to Milltown where he lectured in theology, Corboy served as Rector of Milltown from 1959 until 1962 when he was appointed Bishop of Monze, Zambia, then called North Rhodesia a British Colony until 1964. Corboy's was shaped by the Second Vatican Council, which started the same year as his bishopric, through which he believed evangelization include the whole person, not just souls.

Corboy was given the Tongan name of Cibinda, meaning "a wholesome person who knows where he is going and where he is leading others." 

Following his retirement as Bishop in 1992, he worked for four years at St. Ignatius in Lusaka before returning to Ireland, where he stayed with the Jesuit Community in Milltown, where he worked as the Librarian. After living for a time in Cherryfield Nursing home, Corboy died on 24 November 2004 at St. Vincent's Hospital, Dublin.

Further reading

References

1916 births
2004 deaths
20th-century Irish Jesuits
21st-century Irish Jesuits
Jesuit bishops
Roman Catholic bishops of Monze
Irish expatriate Catholic bishops
People educated at Clongowes Wood College
Alumni of University College Dublin
Pontifical Gregorian University alumni
People from County Limerick